Bosnia and Herzegovina participated in the Eurovision Song Contest 1999 with the song "Putnici" written by Edin Dervišhalidović. The song was performed by Dino and Béatrice. Dino is the artistic name of songwriter Edin Dervišhalidović. The Bosnian broadcaster Radio-Televizija Bosne i Hercegovine (RTVBiH) returned to the Eurovision Song Contest after a one-year absence following their relegation in 1998 as one of the six countries with the lowest average scores over the previous five contests. RTVBiH organised the national final Vaš šlager sezone 1999 in order to select the Bosnian entry for 1999 contest in Jerusalem, Israel. Seventeen entries participated during the show on 6 March 1999 where nine regional juries initially selected "Starac i more" performed by Hari Mata Hari as the winner, however the entry was later disqualified due to the song having previously been released in Finland in 1997 with runner-up "Putnici" performed by Dino and Béatrice being replaced as the Bosnian entry for the contest.

Bosnia and Herzegovina competed in the Eurovision Song Contest which took place on 29 May 1999. Performing during the show in position 22, Bosnia and Herzegovina placed seventh out of the 23 participating countries, scoring 86 points.

Background

The nation's best placing in the contest was fifteenth, which it achieved in 1994 with the song "Ostani kraj mene" performed by Alma Čardžić and Dejan Lazarević. The Bosnian national broadcaster, Radio-Televizija Bosne i Hercegovine (RTVBiH), broadcasts the event within Bosnia and Herzegovina and organises the selection process for the nation's entry. From 1994 to 1997, PBSBiH selected the Bosnian artist through an internal selection process, while a national final was set up to choose the song. The Bosnian entry in 1999 was selected through a national final that featured several artists and songs.

Before Eurovision

Vaš šlager sezone 1999 
The thirty-second edition of Vaš šlager sezone, Vaš šlager sezone 1999, was held on 6 March 1999 at the Skenderija Hall in Sarajevo and hosted by Segmedina Srna and Lejla Babović. The show was broadcast on BHTV1.

Competing entries
74 submissions were received during a submission period where artists and composers to submit their entries in one of the official languages of Bosnia and Herzegovina, and the broadcaster selected eighteen entries to compete in the national final, one of them which was later withdrawn. Among the competing artists was 1981 Yugoslav Eurovision entrant Seid Memić-Vajta and 1991 French Eurovision entrant Amina, the latter who was to perform in a duet with Dino Dervišhalidović but later replaced by Béatrice Poulot.

Final
The final was on 6 March 1999 at the Skenderija Hall in Sarajevo. Nineteen entries participated and the votes from nine regional juries selected "Starac i more" performed by Hari Mata Hari as the winner. Eight of the juries were located in Bosnia and Herzegovina and one was located in Bonn, Germany. In addition to the performances of the competing entries, the show was opened with a guest performance by 1995 Bosnian Eurovision entrant Davorin Popović, while Popović, 1993 Bosnian Eurovision entrant Fazla, 1994 and 1997 Bosnian Eurovision entrant Alma Čardžić, and 1996 Bosnian Eurovision entrant Amila Glamočak performed as the interval acts.

Disqualification and replacement 
Following the Bosnian national final, it was reported that "Starac i more" would be disqualified as the song had previously been released in 1997 by Finnish singer Janne Hurme under the title "Sydänveri". Confirmation of its disqualification was announced on 17 April 1999 during the BHTV1 news programme Dnevnik, along with the announcement that runner-up of the national final, "Putnici" performed by Dino and Béatrice, would represent Bosnia and Herzegovina at the contest. Hari Mata Hari would later represent Bosnia and Herzegovina in the Eurovision Song Contest 2006 with the song "Lejla", placing third in the final.

At Eurovision
According to Eurovision rules, the host country, the "Big Four" (France, Germany, Spain and the United Kingdom), and the 17 countries with the highest average scores between the 1994 and 1998 contests competed in the final. On 17 November 1998, a special allocation draw was held which determined the running order and Bosnia and Herzegovina was set to perform in position 22, following the entry from the Germany and before the entry from Estonia. Bosnia and Herzegovina finished in seventh place with 86 points.

It was the highest ranking Bosnia and Herzegovina had received in the Contest up to that time, and it will remain so until , when Hari Mata Hari, the original winners of this year's national final, were selected to represent Bosnia and Herzegovina with the song "Lejla", where they came third.

Despite high placement, Bosnia and Herzegovina had low average score over the past 5 contests, and so was still forced to skip the  Contest.

The show was broadcast in Bosnia and Herzegovina on BHTV1 with commentary by Ismeta Dervoz-Krvavac. The Bosnian spokesperson, who announced the Bosnian votes during the show, was Segmedina Srna.

Voting 
Below is a breakdown of points awarded to Bosnia and Herzegovina and awarded by Bosnia and Herzegovina in the contest. The nation awarded its 12 points to Sweden in the contest.

References

External links
Bosnian National Final 1999

1999
Countries in the Eurovision Song Contest 1999
Eurovision